Glitch Techs is an American animated streaming television series created by Eric Robles and Dan Milano for Nickelodeon and Netflix. The series premiered on Netflix on February 21, 2020, with a second season premiering on August 17 of the same year.

Premise
Glitch Techs centers on teens Hector "(High) Five" Nieves and Miko "Me-K.O." Kubota in the city of Bailley, where a group of people is secretly dealing with glitches that cause video game characters to manifest as energy beings into the real world that operate based on the coding of their affected games and thus create havoc. To stop such Glitches, these Glitch Techs, working at a local game store as a front, must use their gamer logic with their equipment to counter and win. After capturing and/or destroying the Glitches, they must also fix any damage and erase any memories in order to prevent further panic. Now, after unexpectedly becoming the newest Glitch Techs, High Five and Miko will have to use their skills as gamers to help out.

Cast

Bailley Glitch Techs

Dream Team
 Ricardo Hurtado as Hector "High Five" Nieves/Hi-5, one of the two main characters. An avid gamer with confidence issues who grows with Miko's friendship. Five learned his gaming and computer skills from his father, Emilio, and continues to call him in prison weekly.
 Liam Ramos as Young Five
 Monica Ray as Miko Kubota/Me-K.O./ミK.O., one of the two main characters. A sporadic gamer with energy to spare, she brings Five and herself into the Glitch Techs after remembering a Glitch event. She has bested Five in numerous online co-op games, and is also the only known person that is somehow impervious to the Glitch Tech's memory resetting.

Mitch Squad
 Luke Youngblood as Mitch Williams (a.k.a. MitchFTW), the number one Hinobi gamer in the city of Bailley. He is Five's and Miko's inhospitable and egotistical senior Glitch Tech who tends to abuse his authority, but does have a good side to him. He is later revealed to be the youngest of a four-sibling video game stream-team who gave up his gaming career to focus on his job at Hinobi.
 Zehra Fazal as Zahra Rashid, one of the senior Glitch Techs. She is Muslim and wears a hijab throughout the series. She is a skilled support type specialist, aloof, and willing to casually give an honest answer. In the episode "BUDS", she is implied to have a crush on Five.
 Sandeep Parikh as Haneesh Jyoshi, one of the senior Glitch Techs. He is a proficient hacker and skilled Raid player.
 Greg Nix as Adam Michael Nix, a senior Glitch Tech who mentors and is partner to Bergy during the 'Castle Crawl' mission. He works publicly at the Joystick Junior Arcade to monitor the location, as it is a hotbed for frequent Glitch activity; often failing to spread his cool nickname "Scorekeeper".

Bailley HQ Techs
 Scott Kreamer as Phil Altiere, the Glitch supervisor and trainer for the Bailley branch of Hinobi. Having an exhausted but calm demeanor when at peace, he has the experience needed to guide his trainees. In "BITT Prime", Phil ends up finding a secret file hidden in BITT. He subsequently finds it was made by his younger self, containing a recording that reveals Hinobi Corporate has repeatedly wiped his memory due to unknown circumstances, and other information that apparently could be helpful in the future. His last name is revealed in the same episode.
 Dan Milano as BITT (the Binary Intelligence Tech Trainer), which serves as Phil's robotic assistant, personal data drive, and information provider for Five and Miko. In the episode "BITT Prime", BITT is discovered to store very important information about Phil's past.
 Milano also voices Miko and Five's pet Glitches Ally and Alpha, as well as other computers and glitches. In season two he voices Jimmy Alcorn, the owner of the Joystick Junior Arcade where Glitches frequently appear.
 Josh Sussman as Cecil "Bergy" Bergoch, another noob of Glitch Techs and a fast friend to Hi-5 and Me-K.O. after they join him on an XP Quest. He is often around for comedic relief and the butt of most everyone's jokes.
 Felicia Day as Emma Deveraux, a specialist in training companion pets for Glitch Techs. She views companion pet Glitches as living things, and teaches Miko and Five to reassess how they treat their companion pets.

Dabney Glitch Techs
 Jane Lynch as Joan Fishback, the supervisor for the Hinobi branch from Bailley's neighboring town Dabney. She and Phil have a friendly rivalry with each other.
 Arnie Pantoja as Nameless, a senior Glitch Tech who leads his own squad and hides his face behind a helmet.
 Felicia Day as Simi, a Glitch Tech originally from the Bailley store who transfers to Dabney.
 Vince Green as Wes, a Glitch Tech and Ray's twin brother.
 Afi Ekulona as Ray, a Glitch Tech and Wes' twin sister.

Hinobi Corporate
 Betsy Sodaro as Inspector 7, "Bookworm" Barbara. A former Glitch Tech from Phil's time, she inspects his store to ensure it operates within desired ranges. Covertly, she is to monitor Miko primarily due to her immunity to memory reset, and Five as well as being her friend.
 Fred Tatasciore as the Tech Specialist, a Hinobi agent mainly assigned to Perma-Ban players who abuse Hinobi products that routinely cause glitches. His design is partially inspired by Tatasciore's gaming voice-over role as "Soldier: 76" from Overwatch.

Other characters

Five's family
 Eric Lopez as Papi, Five's grandfather and owner of a Taco food truck.
 Lopez also voices Emilio Nieves, Papi's son, and Five's father. Emilio went to prison for white hat hacking, but still makes weekly video calls to Five.
 Jolene Kim as Abuela, Five's grandmother, and Emilio's mother.

Miko's family
 Stephanie Sheh as Mayumi Kubota, Miko's mother. She maintains a strict and overprotective regimen over Miko due to her daughter's struggles with focusing and want of self-control.  In spite of this, she simply wants the best from Miko deep down cause she loves her, as well as from the rest of her children.
 Dee Bradley Baker as Hugh Kubota, Miko's father. While not as strict as Mayumi, he supports and helps out his wife in her parental functionals; such as driving the kids or giving advice.
 Rachael Russakoff as Nica Kubota, Miko's big sister. Once a gamer who taught Miko how to play video games, now a socially self-conscious high schooler, but still enjoys mobile app games.
 Russakoff also voices the Glitch Tech gauntlets in the series.
 Haley Tju as Lexi Kubota, Miko's little sister. A sports perfectionist and overachiever who knows about Miko's Glitch Tech activities, saving recordings since Miko's start, but promises her secrets safe with her since blackmail is against their "sibling code".
 Amy Hill as Grandma Kubota, Miko's maternal grandmother and Mayumi's mother.

Mitch's family
 Kirby Howell-Baptiste as Audrey "Aud" Williams, Mitch's older sister and a member of the aggro pro-streamer team, "The Furious Four".
 Adetokumboh M'Cormack as Ruf Williams, Mitch's older brother and a member of the aggro pro-streamer team, "The Furious Four".
 Bryton James as Speck Williams, Mitch's older brother and a member of the aggro pro-streamer team, "The Furious Four".

Bailley Residents
 Zehra Fazal as Sabrina, a little girl who occasionally witnesses the Glitch Techs.
 Catherine Taber as Nancy McGillicutty, Lexi's rival in Karate.
 Candi Milo as Lupita, one of the kids who watch Five play games during his breaks from his grandparents' food truck. Her voice and design are based on Lupe from Eric Robles' animated series, Fanboy & Chum Chum.
 Roshon Fegan as Casino, an old friend of Five's whom the latter separated from for a few years, but then reunited in "Smashozaurs".
 Dallas Young voices a young Casino
 Cree Summer as Geraldine Lawson, an old friend of Five's father, Emilio Nieves, and the owner of a retro-gaming store, Game Kingdom. She is named after Gerald Lawson, who helped create the first video game cartridges.
 Nathan Arenas as Mike Simms, a new kid in town with gamer skills on par with or rivaled against Miko's. After a rough first meeting and a competitive dance-off that almost got out of hand, Mike decided to become friends with Miko. Ridley also mentioned having had a grudge against him.
 Johnny Young as Ryu Simms, Mike's older brother.
 Amanda McCann as Blake, a drive-thru attendant at Mama Miyamoto's Spaghetti in a Bucket. She is implied to be attracted to Bergy.
 Ashly Burch as Ridley, a hacker/modder who discovered Hinobi Glitches by experimenting on her personal console and modifies them to be docile pets. She is shown to have extensive trust issues and has panic episodes at the slightest feeling of "betrayal" from others. While initially a good acquaintance to Miko on their initial meeting, Ridley came to distrust her thinking she just wanted her to be "normal" like everyone else around her. She eventually does befriend Miko and Five, however, and even manages to gain Mitch's respect, who spares her from having her memory wiped.

Production
Glitch Techs is produced by Nickelodeon Animation Studio in the United States, with animation services provided by Top Draw Animation and assistance from Flying Bark Productions in Australia. The series was announced on May 25, 2016. Nickelodeon originally ordered a 20 episode first season, with an extra ten episodes greenlit after.  However on January 12, 2019, it was reported that production on the series was stalled and crew members were being laid off. However, Robles later said that Glitch Techs had not been cancelled.

In early 2020, it was confirmed that the series had moved to Netflix, and the first half of the 20 produced episodes would premiere on February 21, 2020 as its first season. On July 22, 2020, it was announced that season 2 would be released on August 17.

Episodes

Series overview

Season 1 (2020)

Season 2 (2020)

Reception 

The series received positive reception from critics and audiences. Emily Ashby of Common Sense Media called the series a "likable gaming-inspired show" that promotes diversity and teamwork. She also said that while there is a "fair amount of game-style violence" there is also "racial and cultural diversity" among the case and emphasis on how a shared mission and teamwork can help them "transcend their differences." She further praised the series for being "well-paced, sharply animated, and nicely suited" for gamers and those dabbling in VR.

References

External links

 
 

2020s American animated television series
2020 American television series debuts
2020 American television series endings
2020 animated television series debuts
English-language Netflix original programming
Netflix children's programming
Nicktoons
Fiction about memory erasure and alteration
American children's animated television series
American flash animated television series
Television shows about video games